The 2009 Quebec Scotties Tournament of Hearts, Quebec's women's provincial curling championship, will be held January 19-25 at the Club de curling Trois-Rivières in Trois-Rivières. The winner represents team Quebec at the 2009 Scotties Tournament of Hearts in Victoria, British Columbia.

Teams

Standings

Scores

January 19
Ross 10-1 G. Tremblay
Bélisle 11-2 J. Tremblay
Brassard 9-2 Marchand
Roy 7-6 Osborne
Bélisle 9-7 Marchand   
Larouche 9-3 Cadorette   
Brassard 11-3 Roy
Osborne 10-3 Cadorette   
Larouche 9-3 Ross
G. Tremblay 10-5 J. Tremblay

January 20
Bélisle 8-2 Brassard
Ross 6-3 Roy
Larouche 9-4 Osborne
Ross 10-2 J. Tremblay   
Marchand 7-1 Roy 
Bélisle 8-5 Cadorette
Brassard 8-6 G. Tremblay
Larouche 9-3 G. Tremblay
Osborne 10-7 J. Tremblay
Marchand 9-5 Cadorette

January 21
Brassard 7-3 J. Tremblay  
Ross 10-2 Cadorette
Roy 10-2 G. Tremblay  
Bélisle 10-7 Osborne   
Larouche 10-3 Marchand
Brassard 7-5 Osborne 
Roy 12-9 Cadorette
Bélisle 6-5 G. Tremblay 
Larouche 14-0 J. Tremblay  
Ross 11-8 Marchand

January 22
Osborne 10-6 G. Tremblay
Marchand 11-4 J. Tremblay
Cadorette 9-6 Brassard
Larouche 9-2 Roy  
Cadorette 8-7 G. Tremblay
Bélisle 9-7 Ross
Larouche 9-4 Bélisle  
Ross 7-2 Brassard  
Osborne 8-2 Marchand  
Roy 7-5 J. Tremblay

January 23
Osborne 8-7 Ross 
G. Tremblay 6-2 Marchand
Bélisle 8-5 Roy 
Cadorette 7-2 J. Tremblay
Brassard 7-5 Larouche

Page playoffs
1 vs. 2, 3 vs. 4, and semi-final on January 24. Final on January 25.

3 vs. 4

1 vs. 2

Semi-final

Final

External links
 Official site 

Quebec
Sport in Trois-Rivières
Curling competitions in Quebec
Quebec Scotties